Jack F. Curry is an American sports commentator. He has worked in television for the YES Network since 2010, providing analysis of New York Yankees baseball games during pregame and postgame shows. He was part of YES's Emmy Award-winning Yankee coverage in 2011. He is also a columnist for Yesnetwork.com.

Until 2009, he was a journalist, most recently as national baseball correspondent for The New York Times. Before taking over that position, he was the newspaper's beat writer covering the Yankees. He worked at The New York Times for 22 years.

Author
In 2000, Curry co-wrote a book with Derek Jeter titled The Life You Imagine: Life Lessons for Achieving Your Dreams. The book was a N.Y. Times best-seller and sold more than 150,000 copies.

In 2019, Curry co-wrote a book with David Cone titled “Full Count: The Education of a Pitcher”.

Television and radio
Before joining YES, Curry was guest on local New York sports programs such as WFAN's "Mike and the Mad Dog" radio program.  He has been seen nationally on networks such as ESPN and MSNBC.

Curry currently works for the YES Network.

Personal
Curry graduated in 1982 from Hudson Catholic Regional High School in Jersey City. Curry was invited to a Hudson Catholic event on May 12 as a guest speaker. On April 23, Curry was inducted into the school's hall of fame.

Curry earned a bachelor's degree in Communications from Fordham University in 1986. Curry and his wife Pamela reside in River Vale, New Jersey.

As discussed on radio interviews and his news blog, he has competed in the New York City marathon.

References

External links

Major League Baseball broadcasters
Fordham University alumni
The New York Times sportswriters
YES Network
Living people
1964 births
People from River Vale, New Jersey
Writers from Jersey City, New Jersey
American male journalists
WFUV people